The Synagogue in Svätý Jur, a small town in Slovakia, north-east of the capital Bratislava, was built around 1790. The building is in private ownership and is in a very bad condition.

History 
Evidence of a Jewish community in Svätý Jur dates from before 1529, when the Jews were expelled from the town. Settlement of individual Jewish families began again in the 17th century.

The synagogue dates from the late 18th century and resembles a late Baroque rural mansion. In 1876 the building underwent some reconstruction.

It stands in the former Jewish courtyard and was surrounded by other Jewish institutions. These were demolished by the current owner, who acquired the property after World War II.

Today it is used for storage and is dilapidated.

Architecture 
On the western side stands a doorway projection with vestibule and women's gallery above. Access to the gallery was through a covered staircase, attached next to it. The sanctuary (the men's prayer room) on the eastern side is a large rectangular hall, emphasised by three bays of windows in the Rundbogenstil.

The Holy Ark stood in the centre of the long side, flanked by two windows (also in Rundbogenstil) and a round window above. Today only an empty niche is visible.

Originally the women's gallery projection opened into the hall. When the synagogue underwent a reconstruction in 1876, interior walls were redecorated with Moorish ornaments and a new women's gallery was constructed. This is supported by cast-iron columns and runs on three sides of the sanctuary.

See also 
 List of synagogues in Slovakia

References

Synagogues in Slovakia
18th-century architecture in Slovakia
Synagogues completed in the 1790s